Bonefish fly patterns are a collection of artificial flies routinely used by fly anglers targeting various species of Bonefish.  Bonefish frequent tidal sand and mudflats in tropical and sub-tropical latitudes to feed on benthic worms, fry, crustaceans, and mollusks.  Bonefish have small mouths and most Bonefish flies are tied on size 4 to 8 saltwater fly hooks.

Early Bonefish patterns
Early records show bonefish being targeted with flies as early as 1926 and by the 1940s fly fishing for bonefish with crude shrimp and baitfish patterns was not uncommon.

Crab patterns

Shrimp patterns

Baitfish patterns

Hybrid patterns
Hybrid patterns are patterns often referred to as general attractor  patterns or patterns specifically designed to imitate more than one type of prey, i.e. both shrimp and crabs.

Notes

Saltwater patterns